Hwang Sang-ho (born 28 May 1971) is a South Korean former wrestler who competed in the 1996 Summer Olympics.

References

1971 births
Living people
Olympic wrestlers of South Korea
Wrestlers at the 1996 Summer Olympics
South Korean male sport wrestlers
Asian Games medalists in wrestling
Wrestlers at the 1994 Asian Games
Asian Games bronze medalists for South Korea
Medalists at the 1994 Asian Games
20th-century South Korean people
21st-century South Korean people